Ernest Leonard Chambers MC (24 July 1882 – 23 November 1946) was a rugby union international who represented England between 1908 and 1910.

Early life
Ernest Chambers was born on 24 July 1882 in London and educated at Bedford School and the University of Cambridge where he won blues for Athletics and rugby.

Rugby career
He played club rugby for Blackheath and Bedford and made his debut for England in a 19–0 victory over France at Stade Colombes on 1 January 1908. His second game for England, against Wales in 1910, was also the inaugural international match played at Twickenham. His third and final match for England was a 0–0 draw against Ireland in the same season.

Military service
Chambers served in World War I in the Northumberland Fusiliers and the King's Own Yorkshire Light Infantry, and was awarded the Military Cross in 1917.

Death
He died on 23 November 1946.

References

1882 births
1946 deaths
English rugby union players
England international rugby union players
People educated at Bedford School
Recipients of the Military Cross
Blackheath F.C. players
Bedford Blues players
Cambridge University R.U.F.C. players
Royal Northumberland Fusiliers officers
King's Own Yorkshire Light Infantry officers
British Army personnel of World War I
Rugby union players from London